Cadulus delicatulus is a species of small tusk shell, a marine scaphopod mollusk in the family Gadilidae. This species is endemic to New Zealand.

It can be found from Northland to Fiordland, including the Chatham Rise and Chatham Islands.

References

Scaphopods
Molluscs described in 1913